Night Slaves is a 1970 American television science fiction horror film directed by Ted Post and starring James Franciscus and Lee Grant. It was based on a 1965 novel by science fiction writer Jerry Sohl, best known for writing episodes of The Outer Limits, Star Trek, Alfred Hitchcock Presents and as ghostwriter for Charles Beaumont on three episodes of  The Twilight Zone. Night Slaves aired as part of the ABC Network's Movie of the Week series.

Plot
Clay and Marjorie, an estranged married couple, take a vacation together while Clay recuperates from a serious auto accident. They end up in a sleepy little town which seems to be normal, except at night when the townspeople begin acting strangely and leave town in trucks, always returning by morning. Marjorie also begins to act strangely, and no one has any memories of their nighttime activities. Only Clay is unaffected due to the presence of a metal plate in his head, and no one believes his story.

Cast
James Franciscus as Clay Howard
Lee Grant as Marjorie Howard
Scott Marlowe as Matt Russell
Andrew Prine as Fess Beany / Noel
Tisha Sterling as Annie Fletcher / Naillil
Leslie Nielsen as Sheriff Henshaw
Morris Buchanan as Mr. Hale
John Kellogg as Mr. Fletcher

Production
The TV movie features the debut of actress Sharon Gless. The teleplay was co-written by Robert Specht who had contributed to the TV series The Outer Limits and The Immortal.

Sohl noted that he was "very pleased with the whole thing...as a matter of fact, it interested me. They did a marvelous job."

Ted Post had directed Franciscus the year before on Beneath the Planet of the Apes and had high regard for Franciscus as an actor. Post worked as a director on TV series, TV movies and theatrical films but brought more than the usual "director-for-hire" ethos, often seeking to improve scripts or refine actors' performances to meet the needs of the material.

Release
The film originally aired on September 29, 1970,	on the American Broadcasting Company (ABC).

See also
 List of American films of 1970
 They Came from Beyond Space

References

External links

1970 films
American science fiction horror films
1970 horror films
ABC Movie of the Week
1970 television films
American horror television films
American science fiction television films
1970s science fiction horror films
Films directed by Ted Post
Films scored by Bernardo Segall
1970s English-language films
1970s American films